For places in the Czech Republic and Slovakia, see Rudná (disambiguation).

Rudna may refer to:

Rudna, Lower Silesian Voivodeship (south-west Poland)
Rudna, Piła County in Greater Poland Voivodeship (west-central Poland)
Rudna, Złotów County in Greater Poland Voivodeship (west-central Poland)
Rudna, Lubusz Voivodeship (west Poland)
Rudna, a village in Giulvăz Commune, Timiș County, Romania